Boston Sessions House is a judicial structure in Church Close, Boston, Lincolnshire, England. The structure, which used to be the main courthouse for the area, is a Grade II* listed building. The site is also home to County Hall, the former headquarters of Holland County Council.

History

The first venue for the quarter sessions in Boston was the Guildhall which had been used for that purpose since 1660. However, in the 1830s, the justices complained that the guildhall was too small for them and it was agreed to commission a new sessions house. The site they selected, just to the north of St Botolph's Church, had been occupied by an Augustine priory.

The new building was the designed by Charles Kirk from Sleaford, built in ashlar stone at a cost of £10,000 and was officially opened on 17 October 1843. The design involved a symmetrical main frontage of five bays facing Church Close. The central section of three bays featured an arched doorway flanked by two bi-partite mullioned and transomed windows, all with traceried panels above; on the first floor there was a large tri-partite mullioned and transomed window flanked by two bi-partite mullioned and transomed windows. The bays were separated by buttresses surmounted by statues of lions and, at roof level, there was a crenelated parapet which was decorated by a panel bearing the Royal coat of arms. The end bays, which were projected forward, took the form of three-stage towers with doorways in the first stage, oriel windows in the second stage and pairs of narrow windows in the third stage; the towers were also surmounted by crenelated parapets. Internally, the principal rooms were the prison cells on the ground floor, a magistrates' retiring room on the first floor and a strong room on the second floor: the main courtroom was at the back of the building.

The building continued to be used as a facility for dispensing justice but, following the implementation of the Local Government Act 1888, which established county councils in every county, it also became the meeting place of Holland County Council. After the county council moved to a dedicated building known as County Hall, which was erected on the same site just to southeast of the sessions house in 1927, the sessions house was used solely for judicial purposes. The county council was abolished when the newly-formed Lincolnshire County Council was formed at the County Offices in Lincoln in 1974.

The local public library service relocated to County Hall in the late 20th century, and the magistrates moved to a new courthouse in Norfolk Street in 2003. In 2016, developers, Paul and Amy Wilkinson took possession of the whole site and initiated works to convert County Hall into a complex of shopping units, apartments and commercial offices for local businesses. Further works to convert the prison cells in the sessions house into a gym were initiated in February 2020.

See also
 Grade II* listed buildings in Boston (borough)

References

Government buildings completed in 1842
County halls in England
Grade II* listed buildings in Lincolnshire
Boston, Lincolnshire